Meedhoo (Dhivehi: މީދޫ) is one of the inhabited islands of Raa Atoll. The Raa Atoll Education Center is located in Meedhoo.

History
Meedhoo was first settled 300 years ago from the island Bodufushi, while Old Friday mosque in Meedhoo was said to be built more than 250 years ago.

Geography

Demography

References

External links
News and information about R.Meedhoo Island

Islands of the Maldives